Piotr Pręgowski (born 15 February 1954) is a Polish actor. He has made over 20 appearances in film and television. He starred in the 1986–1987 television series Zmiennicy. He is known for dubbing Boo-Boo Bear in multiple Yogi Bear shows and movies.

References

External links
 

1954 births
Living people
Polish male film actors
Male actors from Warsaw